Daniel D. Hanna (1923-1993) was a member of the Wisconsin State Assembly.

Biography
Hanna was born on December 5, 1923 in Milwaukee, Wisconsin. After graduating from high school in St. Francis, Wisconsin. Hanna attended Marquette University, the University of Illinois at Urbana-Champaign and the University of Oregon. During World War II, he served in the United States Army Medical Corps. Hanna died on June 21, 1993.

Political career
Hanna was first elected to the Assembly in 1964. Previously, he was Supervisor of Lake, Milwaukee County, Wisconsin. He is a Democrat.

References

Politicians from Milwaukee
Democratic Party members of the Wisconsin State Assembly
Military personnel from Wisconsin
United States Army Medical Corps officers
United States Army personnel of World War II
Marquette University alumni
University of Illinois Urbana-Champaign alumni
University of Oregon alumni
1923 births
1993 deaths
20th-century American physicians
20th-century American politicians